Denise Alexander is an American actress, best known for her role as Lesley Webber on General Hospital, a role she originally played from 1973 to 1984 (contract), 1996 to 2009, and a guest stint in 2013, in honor of the show's 50th anniversary. Alexander returned to General Hospital for two other guest appearances in December 2017 and April 2019, the latter to commemorate the 56th anniversary of the show. She then reappeared in early 2021.

Life and career

Alexander was born in New York City and raised on Long Island. She moved to Los Angeles when her father, Alec Alexander, an agent who handled such notables as Frank Gorshin and Sal Mineo, decided to make the switch from the East to the West Coast. Alexander had appeared on TV and radio by the time she was a junior at UCLA. She made her feature movie debut at age fourteen in the Don Siegel film Crime in the Streets starring John Cassavetes. In 1962 Alexander appeared as Mildred Kroeger on the first season of the TV western The Virginian on the episode titled "Impasse."

Alexander first broke into the soap opera genre by playing Lois Adams on The Clear Horizon in 1960. Her big break on soaps came via the role of Susan Hunter Martin on Days of Our Lives from 1966 to 1973. In 1973, the character of Susan was written out of the show temporarily during contract negotiations with Alexander.  ABC Daytime rushed to offer her a then-unheard of salary/perks package to join General Hospital. When Susan finally returned to Days, a new actress, Bennye Gatteys, played her.

Alexander's role on General Hospital, Dr. Lesley Williams, became a long-running role. She stayed with the show for eleven years as one of the show's most popular leading ladies, leaving in 1984 after a contract dispute. In 1986, she was offered a big salary to portray McKinnon matriarch, Mary, on Another World. When the commute from her home in Los Angeles to Another World'''s studio in New York City proved to be difficult for her, she left the show, filming her last scene in 1989, but briefly returned for a guest appearance in 1991. In 1996, she returned to the role of Lesley (brought back from the dead after almost 13 years) on General Hospital, which she continued playing on a recurring basis until 2009 when the character simply faded from view. She reprised the role in time for the show's 50th anniversary in 2013 and remained on canvas as a recurring character throughout that year. Alexander reprised her role on General Hospital in late December 2017 for a short stint, and also for one episode in April 2019 for the show's 56th anniversary. She also reprised the role in early 2021.

Personal life
Alexander is married to television director and actor Richard A. Colla.

Filmography

In November 1949, Alexander played Perry Como's daughter on Perry Como's Chesterfield Supper Club'' on NBC.  It was a Thanksgiving-themed show with guest Raymond Massey portraying Abraham Lincoln.

References

External links

 
 

Actresses from New York (state)
American soap opera actresses
American film actresses
American television actresses
Living people
People from Long Island
University of California, Los Angeles alumni
20th-century American actresses
21st-century American actresses
Year of birth missing (living people)